This article shows All past squads from the Italian professional volleyball team Volley Bergamo from the Serie A League.

All Past Rosters

2016–17

2015–16

2014–15

2013–14

2012–13

2011–12

2010–11

2009–10

2008–09

2007–08

2006–07

2005–06

2004–05

2003–04

2002–03

References

External links
Official website 
Official supporters website 

Italian women's volleyball club squads